Anders Nyström (8 February 1933 – 17 December 2022) was a Swedish actor.

Selected filmography 

1942: Himlaspelet – Shepherd (uncredited)
1942: Kan doktorn komma? – Boy with Tooth Ache (uncredited)
1943: Katrina – Herman, Saga's and Einar's son (uncredited)
1943: När ungdomen vaknar – Hanseman
1943: The Brothers' Woman – Lill-Nicklas (uncredited)
1943: Gentleman with a Briefcase – Gunnar, Berger's Son
1944: En dotter född – Hanseman, Gunnar and Britta's Son (uncredited)
1944: Torment – Bror Widgren (uncredited)
1944: … och alla dessa kvinnor – Axel
1944: Vändkorset – Olle Odelman
1944: The Emperor of Portugallia – August aged 12 (uncredited)
1945: Maria of Kvarngarden – Nils
1945: I som här inträden – Jan
1945: Barnen från Frostmofjället – Monke
1946: 100 dragspel och en flicka – Pelle Norell
1946: Ödemarksprästen – Carl Rutger von Wessing
1947: Pappa sökes – Kurt Hallman
1947: Maria – Bell Boy (uncredited)
1947: Det kom en gäst – Ulf, Mariannes bror (uncredited)
1952: Defiance – School boy (uncredited)
1971: Badjävlar (TV movie) – Gunnar Nilsson
1972: Spöksonaten (TV movie) – Den förnäme
1972: Den längsta dagen – Gunnar
1975: Pojken med guldbyxorna (TV mini-series) – Tocken
1978–1982: Hedebyborna (TV series) – Sixten Svensson
1980: Det frusna Atlantis
1981: Höjdhoppar'n – High-Jumper
1981: Göta kanal eller Vem drog ur proppen? – Tage
1982: Zoombie (TV mini-series) – Holger Jakobsson
1983: Lykkeland (TV mini-series) – Scenarbetaren
1986: Flykten (TV mini-series)
1987–1988: Goda grannar (TV series) – Helge Runåker
1993: Snoken (TV series) – Fiskaren
1995–1998: Svenska hjärtan (TV series) – Nils
1996: Jerusalem – Sven Persson
1997–1998: Skärgårdsdoktorn (TV series) – Kapten Sandberg
1999: Anna Holt
2000: Nya tider (TV series) – Ordf Harald Nilsson
2001: Pusselbitar (TV mini-series) – Tage
2002: Beck (TV series) – George Waltberg
2005-2007: Saltön (TV series) – Dr. Schenker
2013: Tyskungen – Erik Frankel

References

External links 

1933 births
2022 deaths
Swedish male film actors
Swedish male stage actors
Swedish male child actors
Male actors from Stockholm
20th-century Swedish male actors
21st-century Swedish male actors